The 1922 Texas A&M Aggies  football team represented Texas A&M during the 1922 college football season.

Schedule

References

Texas AandM
Texas A&M Aggies football seasons
Texas AandM